Giovanni di Stefano may refer to:
 Giovanni di Stefano (sculptor) (1443 – c. 1506), Italian sculptor
 Giovanni di Stefano (architect) (fl. 1366–1391), Italian architect who designed the tabernacle at the Basilica of St. John Lateran
 Giovanni Di Stefano (fraudster) (born 1955), Italian fraudster involved in various legal cases